The Lower Peace Region is a land-use framework region in northern Alberta, Canada. One of seven in the province, each is intended to develop and implement a regional plan, complementing the planning efforts of member municipalities in order to coordinate future growth. Corresponding roughly to major watersheds while following municipal boundaries, these regions are managed by Alberta Environment and Parks.

With only 37,759 inhabitants spread over 29% of Alberta's landmass, it is the largest, least populated, and least densely populated region of the province.

Communities

The following municipalities are contained in the Lower Peace Region.

 

Towns
 High Level
 Manning
 Rainbow Lake

Métis settlements
 Paddle Prairie

Municipal districts
 County of Northern Lights
 Municipal District of Opportunity
 Northern Sunrise County

Specialized municipalities 
 Mackenzie County

Improvement districts
 Improvement District No. 24 (Wood Buffalo)

Indian reserves
 Amber River 211
 Beaver Ranch 163
 Bistcho Lake 213
 Boyer River 164
 Bushe River 207
 Carcajou 187
 Child Lake 164A
 Fort Vermilion 173B
 Fox Lake 162
 Hay Lake 209
 Jackfish Point 214
 Jean Baptiste Gambler 183
 John D'or Prairie 215
 Loon Lake 235
 Loon Prairie 237
 Peace Point 222
 Swampy Lake 236
 Tallcree 173
 Upper Hay River 212
 Utikoomak Lake 155
 Wabasca 166
 Wadlin Lake 173C
 Woodland Cree 226, 227, 228
 Zama Lake 210

References

Alberta land-use framework regions